Clayton Bosch (born 10 November 1992) is a South African cricketer. He was included in Border's squad for the 2015 Africa T20 Cup. In August 2018, he was named in Border's squad for the 2018 Africa T20 Cup. In April 2021, he was named in Border's squad, ahead of the 2021–22 cricket season in South Africa.

References

External links
 

1992 births
Living people
South African cricketers
Border cricketers
People from Graaff-Reinet
Cricketers from the Eastern Cape